Er Più – storia d'amore e di coltello is a 1971 Italian black comedy film directed by Sergio Corbucci.

The film is inspired by the true story of roman Romeo Ottaviani bully called er Tinèa.

Plot summary 
The story is set in Rome in 1900. In a seedy area of the city, "borghiciano" Nino Patroni, called in Roman dialect "Er Più de Borgo", seeks to marry a fellow rogue with his sister. Nino also tries to fix himself with the beautiful turbines Rosa, but the girl is disputed by the protagonist with the squire Augustarello, leader of a gang of thugs in the village adverse to that of Nino. After moments of respite and battles with stab wounds, Nino manages to make peace with the family of Augustarello; as a matter of fact, after Nino wounded in a duel, Augustarello accidentally killes himself with his stab.Nino, in view of the wedding, makes also peace with the police officer who arrests him often because of his fights. However, just when the protagonist and Rose are just married, Nino is betrayed and killed by a coward commonly called "the Chinese", a slimy, cowardly and impostor, who is always taunted by Nino and his band.

Cast 
 Adriano Celentano: Nino "Er Fanello" Patroni 
 Claudia Mori: Rosa Turbine 
 Vittorio Caprioli: "Er Cinese" 
 Romolo Valli: Il Maresciallo
 Gianni Macchia: Augustarello Di Lorenzo
 Maurizio Arena: Bartolo Di Lorenzo 
 Fiorenzo Fiorentini: Ignazio il "Frascatano" 
 Ninetto Davoli: Antonio "Totarello" Cerino 
 Gino Santercole: Verdicchio 
 Gino Pernice: Pietro Di Lorenzo 
 Anita Durante: Teresa 
 Alessandra Cardini: Velia  
 Benito Stefanelli: Alfredo Di Lorenzo 
 Mario Castellani: Il Dottore 
 Tonino Guerra

References

External links

1971 films
Italian black comedy films
1970s black comedy films
Films set in Rome
Films scored by Carlo Rustichelli
1971 comedy films
1971 drama films
1970s Italian films
1970s Italian-language films